Brandywine may refer to:

Food and drink
Brandy, a spirit produced by distilling wine
Brandywine tomato, a variety of heirloom tomato

Geographic locations

Canada
Brandywine Falls Provincial Park, British Columbia
Brandywine Mountain, British Columbia

United States
Brandywine Hundred, an unincorporated subdivision of New Castle County, Delaware
Brandywine Park, Wilmington, Delaware
Brandywine School District, northern New Castle County, Delaware
Brandywine High School, a high school in Wilmington, Delaware
Brandywine, Maryland, a census-designated place in Prince George's County
Brandywine, Ohio, an unincorporated community
Brandywine Airport, in Chester County, Pennsylvania
East Brandywine Township, Chester County, Pennsylvania
West Brandywine Township, Chester County, Pennsylvania
Brandywine Creek (Christina River tributary), also known as Brandywine River, in Pennsylvania and Delaware
Brandywine River Museum, in Chadds Ford, Pennsylvania
Brandywine, West Virginia, in Pendleton County
Penn State Brandywine, a Pennsylvania State University campus in Delaware County, Pennsylvania

Arts
 Baranduin or Brandywine River, a river in Middle-earth in the fiction of J. R. R. Tolkien
 Brandywine Productions, a film production company best known for producing the Alien film series
 Brandywine School, a style of illustration and artists' colony in Pennsylvania

Military
Battle of Brandywine, in Chester County, Pennsylvania in the American Revolutionary War
Brandywine Battlefield
USS Brandywine, ship of the United States Navy

See also

Brandywine Creek (disambiguation)
Brandywine Falls (disambiguation)